{{DISPLAYTITLE:C7H15NO3}}
The molecular formula C7H15NO3 may refer to:

 Carnitine, a quaternary ammonium compound
 Vancosamine, aminosugars that are a part of vancomycin and related molecules

Molecular formulas